William Henry Domm (July 24, 1930 – January 8, 2000) was a Member of Parliament (MP) in the House of Commons of Canada from 1979 to 1993. He was best known for his crusades against the metric system and in favour of capital punishment.

Domm represented the riding of Peterborough, Ontario from the 1979 federal election until his defeat in the 1993 election.

Born in St. Catharines, Ontario, Domm was the son of a United Church of Canada minister. He was educated at the Ryerson Institute of Technology and became a radio broadcaster in Peterborough.

Domm's campaign against Metric conversion in Canada was most vocal during the final Pierre Trudeau government of 1980 to 1984. In 1983, he and other Tory MPs illegally pumped gas using Imperial measurements at their "Freedom to Measure" gas station. The station was leased by the MPs in hopes of provoking the government into laying charges and thus allowing a legal challenge to mandatory use of metric. The government ignored the station and it closed after a year. When the Progressive Conservatives formed government following the 1984 federal election, Domm became parliamentary secretary to the Minister of Consumer and Corporate Affairs, the government minister responsible for the metrification program. However, while the Metric Commission was disbanded and rules on enforcing metric were loosened, the "metrification" of the country was not reversed.

Domm's lobbying for the death penalty resulted in a free vote being held in the House of Commons in 1988, however the motion to restore capital punishment was defeated.

He was more successful in his campaign for the restoration of Via Rail service on the Toronto-Peterborough-Havelock line. Domm also took stands against bilingualism, abortion and gun control voting against his party on several occasions.

Electoral record

Archives 
There is a Bill Domm fonds at Library and Archives Canada. Archival Reference number is R3302 (Former Archival Reference number MG32-C93).

References

Sources
Canadian Archival Information Network biography of Domm

1930 births
2000 deaths
Members of the House of Commons of Canada from Ontario
Members of the United Church of Canada
Politicians from St. Catharines
Progressive Conservative Party of Canada MPs